Vince Petrasso (born April 11, 1987 in Toronto, Ontario) is a former Canadian soccer player who played the USL Premier Development League, USL Second Division, and the Canadian Soccer League. He is currently the Director Woodbridge Soccer Club who is youngest Coach in Ontario to win back to back Ontario Cup Finals in 2014-15.

Career

College and Amateur
Petrasso grew up in Woodbridge, Ontario, attended Father Bressani Catholic High School, and played college soccer at Campbell University. He was named to the A-Sun All-Freshman team in his first year at Campbell in 2006, and was an A-Sun Tournament MVP and a league all-tournament team selection as a sophomore in 2007.

During his college years Petrasso also played for the Toronto Lynx and the Cary Clarets in the USL Premier Development League.

Professional
Petrasso turned professional in 2010 when he signed with the Harrisburg City Islanders of the USL Second Division. He made his professional debut on April 24, 2010 in a game against the Real Maryland Monarchs. At the conclusion of the season he briefly played with the York Region Shooters in the Canadian Soccer League.

International
Petrasso was a member of the Canada men's national soccer team.

References

External links
 Harrisburg City Islanders bio
 Campbell bio

1987 births
Living people
Canadian soccer players
Association football midfielders
Toronto Lynx players
Cary Clarets players
Penn FC players
York Region Shooters players
USL League Two players
USL Second Division players
Canada men's youth international soccer players
Soccer players from Toronto
Canadian Soccer League (1998–present) players
Campbell Fighting Camels soccer players